Finnforest may refer to:

 Finnforest (company), a Finnish wood products manufacturer
 Finnforest (band), a Finnish rock band

See also 
 Forest Finns